Nevada is a state located in the Western United States. Nevada has several census-designated places (CDPs) which are unincorporated communities lacking elected municipal officers and boundaries with legal status.

References

External links
 State of Nevada Census Designated Places - Current/TAB20 - Data as of January 1, 2020

Nevada
census-designated places